Escape from Monsta Island! is a studio album released by the Monsta Island Czars, a collective notably featuring MF DOOM under his King Geedorah alias. Although the Monsta Island Czars was founded by MF Grimm, he is absent on the entire album due to his incarceration at the time of its production and release.

Track listing

References

2003 debut albums
MF Doom albums